Aydakayevo (Ayźaqay) is a rural locality (a village) in Karlykhanovsky Selsoviet, Belokataysky District, Bashkortostan, Russia. The population was 336 as of 2010. There are 8 streets.

Geography 
Aydakayevo is located 38 km northwest of Novobelokatay (the district's administrative centre) by road. Karlykhanovo is the nearest rural locality.

References 

Rural localities in Belokataysky District